Demas Paulus Mandacan (February 5, 1975 – April 20, 2020) was an Indonesian politician and member of the Indonesian Democratic Party of Struggle (PDIP). He served as the Regent of Manokwari Regency, in West Papua, from February 17, 2016, until his death in office on April 20, 2020.

Mandacan was born in Manokwari on February 5, 1975. He was Protestant. Mandacan received a master's degree in economic development from Gadjah Mada University.

He was a member of the national Indonesian Democratic Party of Struggle (PDIP) political party and chaired the regional Manokwari PDIP leadership board. Mandacan was sworn in as Regent of Manokwari Regency on February 17, 2016, and held the office until his death in April 2020.

Demas Paulus Mandacan died from a heart attack on April 20, 2020, at the age of 45. He was survived by his wife, Irma P Mandacan.

References

1975 births
2020 deaths
Mayors and regents of places in West Papua (province)
Indonesian Democratic Party of Struggle politicians
Indonesian Protestants
Gadjah Mada University alumni
People from Manokwari
Regents of places in Indonesia